Yuan Jiajun (born 27 September 1962) is a Chinese aerospace engineer and politician who is serving as Communist Party Secretary of Chongqing and a member of the Politburo of the Chinese Communist Party. Before his political career, Yuan was best known for his role as chief of the Shenzhou program, which carried the first Chinese man into space.

Life and career
Yuan was born in Tonghua, Jilin. In September 1980, Yuan graduated from Beijing Institute of Aeronautics and Astronautics, majoring in aircraft design and applied mechanics. In July 1984 he joined the Ministry of Aerospace Industry.  After graduation, he worked as a graduate research student. He studied abroad at the German Aerospace Center, returning to China in August 1990 to work for the "501 office". He ascended the ranks of the ministry steadily, taking on increasingly senior administrative roles. In April 2000, he was named commander of the Shenzhou manned spaceflight program. Thereafter he gained a doctorate from his alma mater, now renamed Beihang University.

Yuan became vice-president of the China Aerospace Science and Technology Corporation in November 2007, and became involved in the Lunar Mission and the join Chinese-Russian mission to explore Mars. He became involved in politics in 2012, joining the party standing committee in Ningxia, and becoming vice-chairman of Ningxia in 2013, and overseeing the operations of the Ningdong Energy and Chemical Operations Industry Base. In August 2014, Yuan was named a party standing committee member of the prosperous coastal Zhejiang province, then assumed the post of executive vice governor.

In November 2016, Yuan was named deputy party chief of Zhejiang and head of the Political and Legal Affairs Commission of Zhejiang. In April 2017, Yuan was appointed as acting governor of Zhejiang; he was confirmed on July 7.

On 31 August 2020, Yuan was appointed as the CPC Secretary of Zhejiang.

On 8 December 2022, Yuan was appointed as the CPC Secretary of Chongqing, succeeding Chen Min'er. 

Yuan has received numerous awards for his work in the Chinese Space Program.

Yuan was an alternate member of the 17th Central Committee of the Chinese Communist Party, and a full member of the 19th Central Committee.

References

1962 births
Living people
People from Tonghua
Chinese aerospace engineers
Scientists from Jilin
Beihang University alumni
Engineers from Jilin
Governors of Zhejiang
Political office-holders in Zhejiang
People's Republic of China politicians from Jilin
Members of the 20th Politburo of the Chinese Communist Party
Members of the 19th Central Committee of the Chinese Communist Party
Alternate members of the 17th Central Committee of the Chinese Communist Party
Delegates to the 13th National People's Congress